2011 marked the Curaçao national team's first year since the dissolution of the Netherlands Antilles, playing their first match against the Dominican Republic on 18 August 2011.

This is a list of Curaçao national football team games in 2011.

2011 games

References

2011
2011 national football team results
2010–11 in Curaçao football
2011–12 in Curaçao football